Walsall College is a further education college in Walsall, West Midlands, England.

The college is the largest provider of qualifications for 14- to 19-year-olds in the Borough of Walsall. In addition, Walsall College provides education and training for adults, delivered both at the college campuses and on-site at workplaces and community centres. Campuses of the college include the main Wisemore Campus, and the Green Lane campus which offers engineering and construction courses.

Courses offered by the college include GCSEs, NVQs, BTECs, Diplomas, Apprenticeships and Access courses. Walsall College's sixth form department, V6 is a vocational sixth form for young people focussing on vocational skills and qualification; however it does not offer A Levels or academic study.

Walsall College also offers its vocational courses through a series of academies, in partnership with businesses including Microsoft, Apple, Francesco Group and Roland DG. The academies include a gym, hair and beauty salon and restaurant. All facilities are staffed by students.

In March 2013 Walsall College achieved an overall Outstanding grade in an OFSTED inspection, in doing so became the first College of its size in the UK to achieve this grading under the new OFSTED framework.

In March 2018, Walsall College merged with another local College, the Walsall Adult Community College (known locally as WACC).  Walsall College inherited all of the campuses and a majority of the staff, the previous establishment is now wholly a part of Walsall College. In November 2020, the CITB's training facility in Kings Norton was sold to Walsall College, with 17 staff also being transferred.

Walsall College also offers a provision of higher education courses in conjunction with the University of Birmingham (through University College Birmingham) and the University of Wolverhampton.

References

External links
 Walsall College homepage
 V6 homepage
 

Further education colleges in the West Midlands (county)
Further education colleges in the Collab Group
Education in Walsall